Doggy style is a sex position in which a woman bends over, crouches on all fours (usually on hands and knees), or lies on her abdomen, for sexual intercourse, other forms of sexual penetration or other sexual activity. Doggy style is a form of a rear-entry position, others being with the receiving partner lying on the side in the spoons sex position or the reverse cowgirl sex position. Non-penetrative sex in this position may also be regarded as doggy style.

Although it is not the most commonly used sex position, it is regarded as the favoured position by men, while the reverse cowgirl position is favoured by women. Between sex partners, the person in the doggy style position is usually passive, while the other partner is active (although sometimes it can be the other way around if the person in doggy position backs up into their partner behind them). Either partner may be the dominant partner or the submissive partner. The submissive partner in the doggy position is open to a variety of additional sexual activities, with the active partner being able to penetrate the vagina, the anus during anal sex, or being in a position to simply massage the whole body.

History and etymology

In ancient Rome, this practice was known as coitus more ferarum, Latin for "sexual intercourse in the manner of wild beasts". The specific origin of the term doggy style is not known, but is presumably a reference to the initial position assumed by dogs when mating. It is described in the Kama Sutra as the cow position or the congress of a cow, and is listed in The Perfumed Garden.

Practices
The posture adopted by the receiving partner resembles lordosis behaviour – a physical posture seen in many female mammals, often when they are ready for sex/mating, the primary characteristic of which is a ventral arching of the spine. During vaginal penetration from behind, the penis may penetrate deeper into the vagina, reaching preferential contact with the posterior wall of the vagina and probably reaching the posterior fornix; while in the missionary position, it is in preferential contact with the anterior wall of the vagina and the tip of the penis can reach the anterior fornix.

In this position, the receiving partner implicitly gives the active partner a carte blanche over their body. Besides other potential sex acts, the active partner may also massage or stimulate the receiving partner's erogenous zones, such as the genitals, nipples, buttocks, administer a spanking, or introduce a sex toy, such as a dildo or vibrator, into the vagina or anus. The doggy position may be erotic or sexually provocative for participants.

Advantages and disadvantages
Doggy style may be a preferred sex position if either partner has back issues or some other medical conditions. During doggy style, the scrotum sometimes provides friction to the clitoris, thus possibly producing an orgasm or sexual stimulation in the woman. For some women, doggy style sex helps to stimulate an area that may be termed "the G-spot". However, this position may offer only minimal stimulation of the clitoris; so some women may require manual stimulation to achieve orgasm. Some men may, however, be able to stimulate the clitoris simultaneously with the penis and the scrotum respectively during doggy style sex.

Doggy style offers benefits as a sex position in group sex, such as during a threesome. Doggy style allows the passive partner to perform fellatio on male participant (termed "spitroast") or to perform cunnilingus on a female participant. 

Some women may feel vulnerable in this position, as it requires and implies a level of trust and a surrender of control by the receiving to the active partner. However, some women find this transfer of control to the partner arousing. According to the book Sexual Pleasure by Barbara Keesling, many established couples find doggy style relationship-affirming.

Some consider doggy style to be unromantic. The position is considered by some to be less intimate because eye contact and kissing are more difficult.

As a theme in art
Doggy style has been known in most cultures in all times, and has been depicted in art:

See also
 Animal roleplay
 Pegging

References

External links

 

Metaphors referring to dogs
Pornography terminology
Sex positions